Vedikkettu is a 1980 Indian Malayalam-language film directed by K. A. Sivadas and produced by Thevannur Maniraj and Santha Gopinathan Nair. The film stars Sukumaran, Jalaja, Prameela and Ramesh in the lead roles. The film has musical score by M. K. Arjunan.

Plot

Cast
Sukumaran
Jalaja
Prameela
Ramesh
Alummoodan
G. K. Pillai
Kaduvakulam Antony
Kottarakkara Sreedharan Nair
Kuthiravattam Pappu
Nellikode Bhaskaran
Stanley
Vettoor Purushan
Vijaya Kumari
R. Balakrishna Pillai
Kollam G. K. Pillai

Soundtrack
The music was composed by M. K. Arjunan.

References

External links
 

1980 films
1980s Malayalam-language films
Films shot in Kollam